Regimental Music (German: Regimentsmusik) is a 1950 German drama film directed by Arthur Maria Rabenalt and starring Heidemarie Hatheyer, Friedrich Domin and Siegfried Breuer. It was an Überläufer, a film made predominantly during the Second World War but not released until after the fall of the Nazi regime. It was based on the novel Die Schuld der Gabriele Rottweil by Hans Gustl Kernmayr and it sometimes known by this title. It was shot at the Bavaria Studios in Munich. The film's sets were designed by the art directors Rudolf Pfenninger and Ludwig Reiber. The film's direction was originally assigned to Georg Wilhelm Pabst before he was replaced by Rabenalt.

Cast
 Heidemarie Hatheyer as Gabriele von Wahl
 Friedrich Domin as Herr von Wahl
 Siegfried Breuer as 	Dr. Robert Rottweil
 Kurt Müller-Graf as 	Leutnant Rainer von Teschenbach
 Gustav Waldau as 	Onkel Max
 Anton Pointner as Heinrich von Stammer
 Gabriele Reismüller as 	Gusti Dankl
 Heini Handschumacher as 	Rudi von Geldern
 Emil Matousek as 	Hugo
 Walter Holten as Oberst Weippert
 Marie Griebel as 	Haushälterin Veronika
 Walther Jung as 	Oberstabsarzt Dr. Wegener	
 Sepp Nigg as 	Post bringender Soldat	
 Fritz Reiff as 	Hausarzt bei Wahl
 Karl Schaidler as Post verteilender Soldat Fischer
 Paul Wagner as 	Kriegsgerichtsrat Westermann	
 Beppo Brem as Soldat mit Rumbecher
 Rosemarie Grosser as Gustis Freundin Resi
 Joseph Offenbach as Assistenzarzt

References

Bibliography 
 Eckart, Wolfgang Uwe. Medizin im Spielfilm des Nationalsozialismus. Burgverlag, 1990.
 Goble, Alan. The Complete Index to Literary Sources in Film. Walter de Gruyter, 1999.
 Rentschler, Eric. The Ministry of Illusion: Nazi Cinema and Its Afterlife. Harvard University Press, 1996.

External links 
 

1950 films
1950 drama films
German drama films
West German films
Films of Nazi Germany
1950s German-language films
Films directed by Arthur Maria Rabenalt
Bavaria Film films
Films shot at Bavaria Studios
German black-and-white films
1950s German films

de:Die Schuld der Gabriele Rottweil